Tricholoma pessundatum is a mushroom of the agaric genus Tricholoma. First described as Agaricus pessundatus by Elias Magnus Fries in 1821, it was transferred to the genus Tricholoma by Lucien Quélet in 1872.

The species has as sour meal odor, and contains toxins which can cause severe gastrointestinal upset.

A very similar species to the European mushroom is Tricholoma muricatum, which differs only in microscopic details.

See also
List of North American Tricholoma
List of Tricholoma species

References

pessundatum
Fungi described in 1821
Fungi of North America
Poisonous fungi
Taxa named by Elias Magnus Fries